The family Palicidae, sometimes called stilt crabs, are a group of crabs. Some genera previously included in this family are now placed in a separate family, the Crossotonotidae.

Genera
The family Palicidae contains nine extant genera and two extinct genera :
Eopalicus Beschin, Busulini, De Angeli & Tessier, 1996 †
Exopalicus Castro, 2000
Miropalicus Castro, 2000
Neopalicus Moosa & Serène, 1981
Palicoides Moosa & Serène, 1981
Paliculus Castro, 2000
Palicus Philippi, 1838
Parapalicus Moosa & Serène, 1981
Pseudopalicus Moosa & Serène, 1981
Rectopalicus Castro, 2000
Spinipalicus Beschin & De Angeli, 2003 †

References

Crabs
Taxa named by Eugène Louis Bouvier
Decapod families